Aechmea floribunda is a species of flowering plant in the genus Aechmea. This species is endemic to Brazil, known from the States of Espírito Santo and Rio de Janeiro.

References

floribunda
Flora of Brazil
Plants described in 1830